The Taiwan Open was the national open golf tournament of Taiwan. It was also known as the Republic of China Open, ROC Open, Chinese Taipei Open, or simply the China Open. It was founded in 1965, and became an event on the Asia Golf Circuit the following year. The Asian PGA Tour was founded in 1995, and the Asian Circuit declined. The Taiwan Open became an event on the new tour in 1999, and was last held in 2006.

Venues
The following venues have been used since the founding of the Taiwan Open in 1965.

Winners

Source:

See also
 List of sporting events in Taiwan

Notes

References

Asia Golf Circuit events
Former Asian Tour events
Golf tournaments in Taiwan
1965 establishments in Taiwan
2006 disestablishments in Taiwan